Nataliya Grigoryeva (born 8 December 1965) is a retired Russian rower who won two silver medals at the world championships of 1985 and 1991. She finished fourth in the eights event at the 1992 Summer Olympics.

References

1965 births
Living people
Olympic rowers of the Unified Team
Rowers at the 1992 Summer Olympics
Russian female rowers

World Rowing Championships medalists for the Soviet Union